Muddanur is a town in Kadapa district of the Indian state of Andhra Pradesh. It is located in Muddanur mandal of Jammalamadugu revenue division. Muddanur has its own train station connecting major cities.

Education
The primary and secondary school education is imparted by government, aided and private schools, under the School Education Department of the state. The medium of instruction followed by different schools are English, Telugu.

Weather 

Muddanur has a hot semi arid climate, where the people and its surroundings are pleasant and enjoyable. During summers, the temperatures soar to about 42-44 °C. Details of the weather are available at

See also 
List of census towns in Andhra Pradesh

References 

Census towns in Andhra Pradesh